LOI, Loi, or LoI may refer to:

People 
 Loi (surname), a surname with various origins, including a list of people with the surname
 Lê Lợi, first emperor of Vietnam's Lê dynasty

Abbreviations 
 League of Ireland, association football
 Letter of intent, in law
 Limited Overs International, type of cricket match
 Limiting oxygen index, in chemistry
 Loss on ignition, in analytical chemistry
 Lunar orbit insertion, a propulsive manoeuvre used to put a spacecraft in an orbit around the Moon
Medium of instruction, also known as Language of instruction and abbreviated as LOI or LoI
 Lodge of Instruction, a type of Masonic Lodge meeting.

Other uses 
 Loi, a word in India's Meitei language for the term "scheduled caste"
 French for "law"
 Loi (ancient city)